Khamzat Khizarovich Chimaev (born 1 May 1994), is a Swedish professional mixed martial artist and freestyle wrestler who competes in the Welterweight division of the Ultimate Fighting Championship (UFC). He formerly competed in Brave Combat Federation. In wrestling, Chimaev is a three-time Swedish National champion. As of 12 April 2022, he is #3 in the UFC welterweight rankings.

Early life and education 
Chimaev was born in the village of Gvardeyskoye in todays Chechnya, Russia, which at that time was the de facto independent Chechen Republic of Ichkeria, where he started wrestling when he was five years old. He allegedly won a bronze medal at the Russian National Championships in the junior level. In 2013, when he was 18, he immigrated to Sweden with his mother, joining his older brother.

Wrestling career
After moving to Sweden, Chimaev wrestled at multiple clubs,  including BK Athén. Considered one of the best freestyle wrestlers in the country, Chimaev won a gold medal at the 2016 and 2017 Swedish Freestyle National Championships at 86 kilograms, and in 2018 he did so at 92 kilograms. Chimaev has had a series of dominant performances in the tournament, posting an overall record of 12–0, which includes three pins, seven technical falls and holds a combined score of 105 points, while only surrendering two himself, across all of his three showdowns. Chimaev has competed in a few judo tournaments and in four combat sambo fights.

Chimaev competed against fellow UFC contender Jack Hermansson in a freestyle wrestling match on 19 November 2021, at Sweden-based Bulldog Fight Night 9, winning on points.

Mixed martial arts career
Chimaev first started training in MMA when he was 23 years old. He trains at Allstar Training Center in Stockholm, along with three-time UFC Light Heavyweight Championship challenger Alexander Gustafsson, Ilir Latifi and Reza Madadi among others. Gustafsson (one of his main training partners) told a Swedish reporter that Chimaev was one of the best fighters he had ever trained with, during a press conference in June 2019.

Early career
In an interview with ESPN, Chimaev claimed he was inspired to start training in MMA during a night at work where he took a 15-minute break to watch the Aldo vs. McGregor main event. Chimaev stated, "I was watching his [McGregor's] fight. I was watching him fight Aldo. I was sitting in night and was working. I was taking rest for 15 minutes and watched his fight. I always look at that like if the guys make so many money like millions and this stuff, why I can't do it now. I'm a fighter, I'm a warrior and I have something special inside me. I had to find some way and take out this to show to the people."

Between September 2017 and April 2018, Chimaev had three amateur MMA fights. The first of them was against future IMMAF World Champion Khaled Laallam, whom he defeated via submission in the second round. He won his following two amateur fights, one by submission and one by technical knockout, completing his amateur career with a record of 3–0.

Chimaev turned professional on 26 May 2018, at International Ring Fight Arena 14, against Gard Olve Sagen. He won the fight via technical knockout in the second round. Chimaev's next fight took place on 18 August 2018, against Ole Magnor at Fight Club Rush 3. He won via submission with a rear naked choke late in the first round.

Brave Combat Federation
After having his first two professional fights in Sweden, Chimaev signed with Middle Eastern organization Brave Combat Federation. He was scheduled to make his promotional debut against Benjamin Bennett on 16 November 2018, at Brave CF 18. However, Bennett withdrew from the bout and was replaced by undefeated prospect Marko Kisič. Chimaev won the fight via technical knockout in the first round after dropping his opponent with a left hand.

Chimaev had a quick turnaround for his next fight when he took on Sidney Wheeler on short notice on 22 December 2018, at Brave CF 20, replacing an injured Leon Aliu. He won the fight via technical knockout in 35 seconds into the first round.

He then fought Ikram Aliskerov on 19 April 2019, at Brave CF 23. This was Chimaev's debut in the welterweight division. He won the bout via knockout after landing an uppercut in the first round. This performance earned him Brave's Knockout of the Night award.

His fourth promotional fight came against Mzwandile Hlongwa on 4 October 2019, at Brave CF 27. Chimaev won the fight via submission in the second round.

Chimaev was expected to challenge Jarrah Al-Selawe for the BCF Welterweight Championship on 18 April 2020, at Brave CF 37, which would be the promotions first event in Chimaev's hometown of Stockholm, Sweden. However, the event would be postponed due to the COVID-19 pandemic and the matchup was cancelled altogether when Chimaev signed with the UFC instead.

Ultimate Fighting Championship
Chimaev made his promotional debut in a middleweight bout against John Phillips, replacing Duško Todorović, on 16 July 2020, at UFC on ESPN 13. He won the fight via submission in the second round. This win earned him the Performance of the Night award.

Ten days after the fight against Phillips, Chimaev faced promotional newcomer Rhys McKee at welterweight on 25 July 2020, at UFC on ESPN 14. He won the fight via technical knockout in the first round. He earned his second Performance of the Night bonus award. This win also marked a new UFC record for the fastest consecutive wins in modern UFC history (ten days), although the official UFC record is still held by Royce Gracie, who achieved four consecutive wins within one night at UFC 2.

It was reported on 6 September 2020, that Chimaev would have another quick turnaround as he was booked to face Gerald Meerschaert on 19 September 2020, at UFC Fight Night 178. He won the fight against Meerschaert via knockout just 17 seconds into round one. This win earned him his third straight Performance of the Night award. This also earned him a new record, as it was the fastest three fight winning streak in modern UFC history (66 days).

Chimaev was scheduled to face Leon Edwards in the main event of UFC Fight Night 183 on 19 December 2020. In between, Chimaev was added to the UFC welterweight rankings, entering at #15. On 29 November, it was announced that Chimaev had tested positive for COVID-19, and the bout was declared to be in jeopardy. On 1 December, Edwards also tested positive for COVID-19 and the bout was subsequently postponed. On 22 December, it was announced that the bout was rescheduled for 20 January 2021, at UFC Fight Night 185. Subsequently, Chimaev pulled out of the contest on 29 December due to his own COVID-19 recovery. As a result, the bout was momentarily cancelled. The pair was rescheduled once again to headline UFC Fight Night 187, on 13 March. However, on 11 February, UFC president Dana White announced the fight was once again cancelled due to Chimaev suffering from lingering effects of COVID-19.

On 1 March 2021, he announced on Instagram that he was retiring from the sport due to lung complications caused by COVID-19. Dana White later came out and said Chimaev was not retired and was just emotional after experiencing effects of prednisone for his lungs during a training session.

Chimaev returned to face Li Jingliang on 30 October 2021, at UFC 267. He won the bout via technical submission, choking Jingliang unconscious with a rear-naked choke in round one. This win earned him his fourth straight Performance of the Night award.

Chimaev faced Gilbert Burns at UFC 273 on 9 April 2022. Chimaev won the fight via unanimous decision, the first decision victory of his career. The fight was awarded the Fight of the Night award. The fight also earned him first place in the Crypto.com Fan Bonus of the Night award.

Chimaev was scheduled to face Nate Diaz on 10 September 2022 in the main event of UFC 279. At the weigh-ins, Chimaev weighed in at 178.5 pounds, seven and a half pounds over the welterweight non-title fight limit. As a result of missing weight, Chimaev was removed from his main event bout with Diaz, and instead faced Kevin Holland in the co-main event at a 180-pound catchweight bout. Holland was already set for a 180-pound catchweight bout against Daniel Rodriguez on the card. Chimaev won the bout via D'Arce Choke in the first round.

Training
Chimaev has trained at Allstar Training Center in Stockholm, Sweden since he was 23 years of age. He moved there to start his MMA career in 2017, after previously living in another Swedish town, Kalmar, where he trained at the local wrestling club. Chimaev continues to train alongside current and former UFC fighters such as Alexander Gustafsson, Ilir Latifi and Reza Madadi, with the latter being his main trainer.

In 2022, Chimaev and UFC title challenger Darren Till got in contact to train with each other, with Till arriving to Stockholm in February, and have since been training at Allstar Training Center and shooting content for YouTube and Blockasset.

In an interview, Chimaev revealed he trains up to five times a day on the peak of training camps, and two to three times when he has no fights coming up.

Fighting style 
Chimaev often utilizes his freestyle wrestling in his fights to get his opponents to the ground. Once he is on top control, he employs different techniques to gain control over his opponents and land heavy ground-and-pound or seek submissions, while forcing his weight towards them. His grappling is very often compared to Khabib Nurmagomedov's, due to the similarities of the techniques, such as the handcuff lock and hooking the legs. Regarding strikes, Chimaev landed 192–2 in his first two UFC bouts utilizing this strategy. Chimaev also proved its effectiveness on the regional circuit as well, with a quick win over former two-time GHSA wrestling champion Sidney Wheeler after taking him down with an  outside trip.

In addition to his grappling abilities, Chimaev will also strike in his contests. Although his striking is still relatively unknown and untested, it involves heavy knockout power from the orthodox stance while utilizing basic boxing and mixing up kicks. He also uses his wrestling to set up his strikes by feinting different takedowns and vice versa. By using his striking, Chimaev has been able to knock out UFC veteran Gerald Meerschaert  in 17 seconds with a single punch. He has previously used it to drop past opponents on the regional circuit, including former combat sambo World Champion Ikram Aliskerov.

Personal life 
Khamzat has an older brother named Artur, who competes in freestyle wrestling. Chimaev represents Sweden in MMA competition, having moved to Kalmar when he was 19 years old. He carries a notable scar on his lip, which he got at the age of two when he fell down on concrete stairs, leaving him unable to breathe correctly through one nostril.

Before he began competing professionally, he worked at a poultry factory in Kalmar and also did security work.

Chimaev contracted COVID-19 in December 2020 and suffered lingering symptoms that required multiple hospitalizations and the cancelation of a scheduled fight against Leon Edwards.

Chimaev is close to Chechen leader Ramzan Kadyrov. Kadyrov gifted Chimaev a Mercedes-Benz, which he crashed months later. Kadyrov also allegedly convinced Chimaev to not retire in March 2021 and go back to Chechnya, which led to speculation on the media on whether Chimaev had been forced to do so. Chimaev was present during a livestream in which Kadyrov threatened to kill a minor who criticized his repressive rule. Chimaev has also sparred with Kadyrov, and appeared in multiple photoshoots with Kadyrov. In March 2022, Chechen dissidents criticized Chimaev's continued association with Kadyrov due to his repressive rule of the Chechen Republic. Also in 2022, Chimaev began training Kadyrov's two teenage sons, Zelimkhan (Ali) and Adam. He was in Ali's corner at his professional MMA debut at ACA 150 in December, accompanied him to UFC 280 in Abu Dhabi, and took him to train to Tiger Muay Thai in Thailand.

Chimaev got married on 21 May 2022, in Chechnya and the wedding was attended by Chechen leader Ramzan Kadyrov.

Chimaev is close with fellow mixed martial artists Darren Till and Jack Hermansson.

Championships and accomplishments

Mixed martial arts
Ultimate Fighting Championship
Fight of the Night (One time) 
Performance of the Night (Four times) 
Record for fastest consecutive wins in Modern UFC history (ten days)
Record for quickest three fight win streak in Modern UFC history (66 days)
2020 UFC Honors Debut of the Year
Crypto.com 
Fan Bonus of the Night 
Brave Combat Federation
Knockout of the Night (One time) 
Nordic MMA Awards – MMAviking.com
2018 Prospect of the Year
2020 Male fighter of the Year
MMAjunkie.com
2020 September Knockout of the Month 
2020 Newcomer of the Year
MMA Fighting
 2020 "Breakout Fighter of the Year"
CombatPress.com
 2020 "Breakthrough Fighter of the Year"
BT Sport
2020 Breakthrough Fighter of the Year

Freestyle wrestling
Swedish Wrestling Federation
2018 Swedish Championships champion, 92 kg
2016 Swedish Championships champion, 86 kg
2016 Solacup Championships champion, 86 kg
2015 Hammarslaget Championships champion, 86 kg 
2015 Swedish Championships champion, 86 kg
2015 Lilla Mälarcupen Championships champion, 86 kg

Mixed martial arts record

|-
|Win
|align=center|12–0
|Kevin Holland
|Submission (brabo choke)
|UFC 279
|
|align=center|1
|align=center|2:13
|Las Vegas, Nevada, United States
|
|-
|Win
|align=center|11–0
|Gilbert Burns
|Decision (unanimous)
|UFC 273
|
|align=center|3
|align=center|5:00
|Jacksonville, Florida, United States
|
|-
|Win
|align=center|10–0
|Li Jingliang
|Technical Submission (rear-naked choke)
|UFC 267
|
|align=center|1
|align=center|3:16
|Abu Dhabi, United Arab Emirates
|
|-
| Win
| align=center|9–0
| Gerald Meerschaert
| KO (punch)
| UFC Fight Night: Covington vs. Woodley
| 
| align=center|1
| align=center|0:17
| Las Vegas, Nevada, United States
| 
|-
| Win
| align=center| 8–0
| Rhys McKee
| TKO (punches)
| UFC on ESPN: Whittaker vs. Till
| 
| align=center| 1
| align=center| 3:09
| Abu Dhabi, United Arab Emirates
| 
|-
| Win
| align=center| 7–0
| John Phillips
| Submission (brabo choke)
| UFC on ESPN: Kattar vs. Ige
| 
| align=center| 2
| align=center| 1:12
| Abu Dhabi, United Arab Emirates
| 
|-
| Win
| align=center| 6–0
| Mzwandile Hlongwa
| Technical Submission (brabo choke)
| Brave CF 27
| 
| align=center| 2
| align=center| 1:15
| Abu Dhabi, United Arab Emirates
| 
|-
| Win
| align=center| 5–0
| Ikram Aliskerov
| KO (punch)
| Brave CF 23
| 
| align=center| 1
| align=center| 2:26
| Amman, Jordan
| 
|-
| Win
| align=center| 4–0
| Sidney Wheeler
| TKO (submission to punches)
| Brave CF 20
| 
| align=center| 1
| align=center| 0:35
| Hyderabad, India
| 
|-
| Win
| align=center| 3–0
| Marko Kisič
| TKO (punches)
| Brave CF 18
| 
| align=center| 1
| align=center| 3:12
| Manama, Bahrain
| 
|-
| Win
| align=center| 2–0
| Ole Magnor
| Submission (rear-naked choke)
| Fight Club Rush 3
| 
| align=center| 1
| align=center| 4:23
| Västerås, Sweden
| 
|-
| Win
| align=center| 1–0
| Gard Olve Sagen
| TKO (punches)
| International Ring Fight Arena 14
| 
| align=center| 2
| align=center| 0:05
| Uppsala, Sweden
| 

|-
| Win
|align=center| 3–0
| Adnan Music
| TKO (punches)
| Nordic Warrior 3
| 
|align=center| 1
|align=center| 0:57
| Nyköping, Sweden
| 
|-
| Win
|align=center| 2–0
| Danijel Grbic
| Submission (guillotine choke)
| Kashio Battle 14
| 
|align=center| 2
|align=center| 2:20
| Helsingborg, Sweden
| 
|-
| Win
|align=center| 1–0
| Khaled Laallam
| Submission (brabo choke)
| Fight Club Rush 1
| 
|align=center| 2
|align=center| 2:06
| Västerås, Sweden
|

Freestyle wrestling record 

! colspan="7"| Senior Freestyle Matches  
|-
!  Res.
!  Record
!  Opponent
!  Score
!  Date
!  Event
!  Location
|-
|Win
|24–0
|align=left| Jack Hermansson
|style="font-size:88%"|8–0
|style="font-size:88%"|19 November 2021
|style="font-size:88%"|Bulldog Fight Night 9
|style="text-align:left;font-size:88%;"|
 Gothenburg, Sweden
|-
! style=background:white colspan=7 |
|-
|Win
|23–0
|align=left| Albin Frid
|style="font-size:88%"|7–0
|style="font-size:88%" rowspan=4|June 3, 2018
|style="font-size:88%" rowspan=4|2018 Swedish National Wrestling Championships
|style="text-align:left;font-size:88%;" rowspan=4|
 Örnsköldsvik, Sweden
|-
|Win
|22–0
|align=left| Tobias Mathisen
|style="font-size:88%"|TF 10–0
|-
|Win
|21–0
|align=left| Oskar Hjelm
|style="font-size:88%"|TF 10–0
|-
|Win
|20–0
|align=left| Farid Teymori
|style="font-size:88%"|TF 10–0
|-
! style=background:white colspan=7 |
|-
|Win
|19–0
|align=left| Alireza Rezai
|style="font-size:88%"|TF 10–0
|style="font-size:88%" rowspan=3|July 10, 2016
|style="font-size:88%" rowspan=3|2016 Swedish National Wrestling Championships
|style="text-align:left;font-size:88%;" rowspan=3|
 Norrköping, Sweden
|-
|Win
|18–0
|align=left| Anton Carlsson
|style="font-size:88%"|TF 10–0
|-
|Win
|17–0
|align=left| Fredrik Almén
|style="font-size:88%"|Fall
|-
! style=background:white colspan=7 |
|-
|Win
|16–0
|align=left| Henrik Martengård
|style="font-size:88%"|TF 12–2
|style="font-size:88%" rowspan=2|May 7, 2016
|style="font-size:88%" rowspan=2|2016 Solacup
|style="text-align:left;font-size:88%;" rowspan=2|
 Karlstad, Sweden
|-
|Win
|15–0
|align=left| Christian Nielsen
|style="font-size:88%"|Fall
|-
! style=background:white colspan=7 |
|-
|Win
|14–0
|align=left| Christian Nielsen
|style="font-size:88%"|Fall
|style="font-size:88%" rowspan=4|September 26, 2015
|style="font-size:88%" rowspan=4|2015 Hammarslaget
|style="text-align:left;font-size:88%;" rowspan=4|
 Hallstahammar, Sweden
|-
|Win
|13–0
|align=left| Sven Engström
|style="font-size:88%"|TF 10–0
|-
|Win
|12–0
|align=left| Martin Sandin
|style="font-size:88%"|TF 10–0
|-
|Win
|11–0
|align=left| Farid Teymori
|style="font-size:88%"|TF 10–0
|-'
! style=background:white colspan=7 |
|-
|Win
|10–0
|align=left| Naib Ilaladayev
|style="font-size:88%"|TF 12–2
|style="font-size:88%" rowspan=5|July 4, 2015
|style="font-size:88%" rowspan=5|2015 Swedish National Wrestling Championships
|style="text-align:left;font-size:88%;" rowspan=5|
 Sundsvall, Sweden
|-
|Win
|9–0
|align=left| Filip Krantz
|style="font-size:88%"|4–0
|-
|Win
|8–0
|align=left| Sven Engström
|style="font-size:88%"|Fall
|-
|Win
|7–0
|align=left| Mattias Balkevärn
|style="font-size:88%"|Fall
|-
|Win
|6–0
|align=left| Simon Brandström
|style="font-size:88%"|TF 10–0
|-
! style=background:white colspan=7 |
|-
|Win
|5–0
|align=left| Naib Ilaldayev
|style="font-size:88%"|TF 14–4
|style="font-size:88%" rowspan=5|February 3–4, 2015
|style="font-size:88%" rowspan=5|2015 Lilla Mälarcupen
|style="text-align:left;font-size:88%;" rowspan=5|
 Västerås, Sweden
|-
|Win
|4–0
|align=left| Samuel Thaken
|style="font-size:88%"|Fall
|-
|Win
|3–0
|align=left| Billy Granberg
|style="font-size:88%"|Fall
|-
|Win
|2–0
|align=left| Edgar Mrad
|style="font-size:88%"|TF 12–0
|-
|Win
|1–0
|align=left| Emil Bertzell
|style="font-size:88%"|TF 12–0
|-

See also 
 List of current UFC fighters
 List of male mixed martial artists
 List of undefeated mixed martial artists

References

External links
  
 

1994 births
Living people
Swedish male mixed martial artists
Swedish male sport wrestlers
Swedish practitioners of Brazilian jiu-jitsu
Chechen mixed martial artists
Chechen practitioners of Brazilian jiu-jitsu
Russian male mixed martial artists
Russian male sport wrestlers
Welterweight mixed martial artists
Middleweight mixed martial artists
Mixed martial artists utilizing freestyle wrestling
Mixed martial artists utilizing Brazilian jiu-jitsu
Ultimate Fighting Championship male fighters
Russian emigrants to Sweden
Russian people of Chechen descent
Swedish people of Chechen descent
Sportspeople from Chechnya